Manu Honkanen (born 29 April 1996) is a Finnish ice hockey player. He is currently playing with Tappara in the Finnish Liiga.

Honkanen made his Liiga debut playing with HC TPS during the 2013–14 Liiga season.

References

External links

1996 births
Living people
Finnish ice hockey forwards
Tappara players
HC TPS players
Sportspeople from Turku
Ice hockey players at the 2012 Winter Youth Olympics
Youth Olympic gold medalists for Finland